The Vladimir Spivakov International Charity Foundation represents Jeunesses Musicales Russia and has been a member of Jeunesses Musicales International since 2005.

History

The Spivakov Foundation was founded in May 1994 as a non-commercial organization. Its Board of Trustees performing advisory and representative activities was composed of artists and medical specialists, of  politicians and mass media leaders, economists and businessmen.

The principal goals of the Spivakov Foundation's activities are: to assist young people gifted in music and arts in the development of their talents and in the organization of their creative process in Russia and abroad; to preserve and develop cultural values and traditions and to provide comprehensive charity support. The Foundation helps young talented musicians, dancers, painters and authors, organizing for them master classes, concerts, tours and exhibitions. Pupils of the foundation participate in national and international competitions and festivals. Since 1994 the Spivakov Foundation is a co-organizer and a permanent participant of the International Musical Festival in Colmar, France.

Permanent support is given to specialized music schools in Moscow,
St. Petersburg, Siberia, the Ural and Volga regions, Ukraine and Belarus as well as to a number of art schools and art studios by providing them with necessary materials and school supplies.

The Spivakov Foundation participates in the programs contributing to the development of human personality, in the domains of education, science, culture and art. The Foundation carries out charitable activities in the sphere of children's health care; it supports orphanages, children's homes and children's hospitals. The Spivakov Foundation is a partner of a number of national and international organizations working in the domain of musical culture. It participates in the UNESCO project "In Support of the Culture of Peace and Non-Violence".

Achievements

In 2000 UNESCO awarded to the Spivakov Foundation the honorary medal "For the contribution to the development of the musical culture of the 3rd millennium".
Branches of the Spivakov Foundation are functioning in Yerevan, Armenia and in Colmar, France, in Kharkov, Ukraine, in Croatia. Representative offices are opened in Ufa, Togliatti, Smolensk (Russia); in Kirghizia, in Uzbekistan and in Germany.

Activities
The activities of the Foundation combine both humanitarian and educational targets: creation of better life conditions for orphans and support for sick children, assistance to children gifted in music and arts in their development and growth, acquisition of musical instruments for children, allocation of scholarships and grants, participation of young musicians in concerts and festivals, organization of master classes, tours and exhibitions for young artists.

Organization of concerts for young talents is one of the most important activities of the Spivakov Foundation, such as series of concerts at the Moscow International Performing Arts Center, the State Armoury, the N.Roerich Museum, the Moscow Philharmonic Society,  concert halls over Russia, the CIS and the Baltic countries, in orphanages, boarding schools, retired-people homes,  young delinquents rehabilitation centers. 

The Foundation acquires and passes musical instruments on to young musicians. The Foundation allocates scholarships and bonuses to bursars of the Foundation, arranges financial assistance for children in need, covers medical treatment of indisposed children, and provides medical instruments and medicines.

Coaching and promotion of young talents is one of the main goals of the Spivakov Foundation.  These activities involve master classes with leading musicians and teachers in Russia, sending young musicians to master classes and music schools abroad, CD recording and releasing, printing booklets etc.

Events

May, 27 – 3 June 2008 

The V International Festival MOSCOW MEETS FRIENDS «Time for charity»

 About 2000 young talents – musicians, dancers and even circus artists – to participate
 About 20,000 people will have the opportunity to visit concerts and other Festival events. Not less than 10 mln people will see online translations and read publications on the festival.
 Festival aims to influence the public positively in order to encourage charity and call for attention of the authorities and society to be paid on the abandoned children’s problems.

See also
 Jeunesses Musicales Russia
 Jeunesses Musicales International
 Vladimir Spivakov

External links
 Official website of the Vladimir Spivakov International Charity Foundation

Foundations based in Russia
Music organizations based in Russia
Charities based in Russia